Tara Webb is an Australian sound editor. She was nominated for an Academy Award in the category Best Sound for the film The Power of the Dog. Webb also served as a sound engineer for the film The Power of the Dog.

Selected filmography 
 The Power of the Dog (2021; co-nominated with Richard Flynn and Robert Mackenzie)

References

External links 

Living people
Place of birth missing (living people)
Year of birth missing (living people)
Australian sound editors
Women sound editors